A chassis cab, also called a cab chassis or half truck, is a type of vehicle construction, often found in medium duty truck commercial vehicles.

Instead of supplying the customer with a factory pre-assembled flatbed, cargo container, or other equipment, the customer is given the vehicle with just chassis rails and a cab. This allows the customer to add any desired aftermarket equipment, such as fire apparatus, ambulance, or a recreational vehicle conversion package, which can be customized for the specific needs of the customer.

Cutaway van chassis are similar vehicles, but have specific components at the rear whereas chassis cabs usually do not have additional components.

Vehicles of this type are produced by Ford, Chevrolet/GMC, and Ram Trucks.

References

Trucks